The 2012 Offaly Senior Hurling Championship was the 114th staging of the Offaly Senior Hurling Championship since its establishment by the Offaly County Board in 1896. The draw for the 2012 fixtures took place on 28 January 2012. The championship began on 11 May 2012 and ended on 7 October 2012.

Coolderry were the defending champions, however, they were defeated in the quarter-final stages by St Rynagh's. Shamrocks were relegated from the championship. Kilcormac–Killoughey won the title following a 2-16 to 2-12 defeat of St Rynagh's in the final.

Teams

All but one of the twelve teams from the 2011 championship participated in the top tier of Offaly hurling in 2012.

Brosna Gaels, who defeated St Rynagh's by 0-13 to 0-8 in the final of the intermediate championship in 2011, availed of their right to automatic promotion to the senior championship.

Similarly, Lusmagh were defeated in the 2011 senior relegation play-off and were relegated to the intermediate grade for 2012.

The twelve teams were divided into two groups:

Group 1: Coolderry, Kilcormac–Killoughey, Seir Kieran, Kinnitty, Brosna Gaels, Shamrocks

Group 2: Birr, St Rynagh's, Tullamore, Drumcullen, Shinrone, Belmont

Results

Relegation play-off

Qyarter-finals

Semi-finals

Final

External links

 Aidan Bracken Building Design Hurling Championship 2012

References

Offaly Senior Hurling Championship
Offaly Senior Hurling Championship